Badan Warisan Malaysia (Malaysian Heritage Trust) (104789-A) is a non-government organisation formed in 1983, concerned with the conservation and preservation of Malaysia's built heritage. It is a voluntary organisation with tax-exempt status.

Since its founding in 1985, Badan Warisan Malaysia have been involved in building conservation projects throughout Malaysia including Suffolk House in Penang, Stadium Merdeka, Gedung Raja Abdullah and Masjid DiRaja Sultan Suleiman in Klang, Bangunan Sulaiman and Rumah Penghulu Abu Seman in Kuala Lumpur, No. 8 Heeren Street in Melaka's UNESCO World Heritage Site, Rumah Kutai in Kuala Kangsar, Istana Tunku Long in Kuala Terengganu and Istana Jahar in Kota Bahru.

The secretariat for Badan Warisan Malaysia is located at No.2, Jalan Stonor in Kuala Lumpur, in a colonial bungalow which was restored and adapted in 1995 as a Heritage Centre with exhibition, seminar, and meeting facilities.

Also located at No. 2 Jalan Stonor is the Chen Voon Fee Resource Centre (CVFRC). This is a closed-access specialised library and information centre which houses a collection of documents, books, periodicals, articles, measured drawings, slides, newspaper cuttings and photographs covering a range of topics from architecture, heritage sites, history and culture and legislation related to heritage in Malaysia and the region. The CVFRC is open to the public and supported by the Chen Voon Fee Charitable Trust Fund.

Badan Warisan Malaysia 2022 Council consists of President: Esme Lim Wei-Ling, Vice President: Dato’ Zahim Albakri, Honorary Secretary: YM Tengku Nasariah YM Tengku Syed Ibrahim, Honorary Treasurer: Lena Tan, and Council Members; Ar. Anand Krishnan, Ar. Lim Take Bane, Caesar Loong, Omar bin Malek Ali Merican & Suridah Jalaluddin. Honorary Council Members; TPr Afzal Azhari, Nisha Dobberstein, Sujatha Sekhar Naik, Pascale Sutherland & Viji Krishnamoorthy.

References

External links 

 
 

Heritage organizations
Cultural organisations based in Malaysia
History organisations based in Malaysia